Poniky is a village and municipality in Banská Bystrica District in the Banská Bystrica Region of central Slovakia.

History
In historical records the village was first mentioned in 1282.

Geography
The municipality lies at an altitude of 502 metres and covers an area of 59.037 km2. It has a population of about 1,564 people.

References

External links

 

Villages and municipalities in Banská Bystrica District